The Saint Mary River is a cross-border tributary of the Oldman River, itself a tributary of the South Saskatchewan River. The Saint Mary together with the Belly River and Waterton River drains a small portion of Montana, in the United States, to the Hudson Bay watershed in Canada.

The river rises as a stream on Gunsight Mountain in Glacier National Park and flows into Gunsight Lake, then flows into Saint Mary Lake, exits the park and flows on into Lower St. Mary Lake in the Blackfeet Indian Reservation. From the reservation, the St. Mary River flows into Alberta and into the St. Mary Reservoir. It flows into the Oldman River which eventually reaches the Saskatchewan River.

It passes near the town of Cardston, Alberta, and the city of Lethbridge, Alberta.

Irrigation

The St. Mary River also provides water for irrigation in Southern Alberta.

The irrigation project was started in 1898, and on September 4, 1900, the first water was brought to Lethbridge by the project. In December 1945 the Canadian Pacific Railway transferred control of the projects to the government of Alberta, creating the St. Mary and Milk River Development (SMRD). A dam was created in 1946 on the St. Mary River, to service the irrigation system, and water finally reached Medicine Hat in 1954 upon the completion of the St. Mary Main Canal.

See also

List of rivers of Alberta
List of rivers of Montana
Montana Stream Access Law
 St. Mary Reservoir

Notes

Landforms of Glacier National Park (U.S.)
International rivers of North America
Irrigation districts
Irrigation in Canada
Rivers of Glacier County, Montana
Rivers of Alberta
Rivers of Montana
Lewis Range
South Saskatchewan River
Tributaries of Hudson Bay